The Sistema Coriano also known as Lara-Falcón Formation, Coro region or Coriano system is one of the eight natural regions of Venezuela. Is the hilly and semi-mountainous area in northwest Venezuela, north of the Mérida Andes and east of the Maracaibo Basin, extending north to the  Caribbean coast.  It consists mostly of east–west running ridges, with the exception of the Sierra de Siruma or Empalado which run north–south.

Ecology
The region contains the Paraguana xeric scrub ecoregion.
The coastal plain contains Venezuela's only desert, the Médanos de Coro (the Coro Dunes), on the Paraguaná Peninsula.
The Coro region is one of the ten geographical regions into which Venezuela can be divided. Because the two major depression valleys are the Falcón and the Lara, the mountains are sometimes called the Falcón-Lara ranges.  The geographic region covers all of Falcón State, half of  Lara State and Yaracuy State, and small percentages of Zulia State and Carabobo State. It's the 3rd largest natural region in the country, covering 5.75% of Venezuela.

Hydrology
Coro region is very dry, with the evaporation rate frequently exceeding the precipitation rate at the lower elevations. There are three major river systems in the region.  The Pedregal and Paraíso rivers which feed into the Mitare River which empties into the Coro Gulf. The Morere, Barigua and Bucares rivers which together form the Tocuyo River, arguably the most important river in the area draining 223.44 square kilometres, and emptying into the Caribbean near the Triste Gulf.  The Tocuyo river crosses the ecoregion called the Lara Falcón Dry Forest.  In the valleys of the Lara-Falcón depression, the Turbio river is the most important due to its volume of water; its mouth is near the Orinoco River basin.

Geology
With the exception of the Siquisique highlands (which are an igneous remnant of Jurassic age), the rocks are Cenozoic, mostly 30 to 70 m.y.o., (Paleocene, Eocene, Oligocene), overlaid by some Pleistocene and Holocene alluvial deposits.  This corresponds well with the Andean orogeny.

Economy
There are some oil deposits, but mainly the population relies on subsistence farming with some cattle grazing.  The dry climate is not conducive to commercial agriculture, but there are some aloe vera plantations.  There is some mining in the higher mountains and fishing on the coast.

Towns
Barquisimeto
Cabudare
Carora
Coro
Dabajuro
Punto Fijo
Riecito
El Tocuyo

References

Trinidad & Gulf of Paria: long-lived foreland basin (Campanian-Quaternary) with Neogene salt-dissolution 'piggyback' basins by Roger Higgs. 
 Bartok, P. E.  (1985) “The Siquisique ophiolites, Northern Lara State, Venezuela: A discussion on their Middle Jurassic ammonites and tectonic implications” Geological Society of America Bulletin: Vol. 96, No. 8, pp. 1050–1055.
Valles y serranías de Falcón - Lara – Yaracuy in Spanish.
 MARAVEN (1988) Serie estudios regionales. Sistemas Ambientales Venezolanos. Región Centro occidental. Estados Lara, Falcón, Portuguesa y Yaracuy. Ediciones MARAVEN. Caracas.
 World Wildlife Fund: Paraguaná xeric scrub (NT1313)

Natural regions of Venezuela
Geographical regions of Venezuela
Geography of Lara (state)
Geography of Falcón
Geography of Yaracuy